The Musicians or Concert of Youths (c. 1595) is a painting by the Italian Baroque master Michelangelo Merisi da Caravaggio (1571–1610). It is held in the Metropolitan Museum of Art, New York, where it has been since 1952. It underwent extensive restoration in 1983. 

Caravaggio entered the household of Cardinal Francesco Maria Del Monte sometime in 1595, and The Musicians is thought to have been his first painting done expressly for the cardinal. His biographer, the painter Baglione, says he "painted for the Cardinal youths playing music very well drawn from nature and also a youth playing a lute," the latter presumably being The Lute Player, which seems to form a companion-piece to The Musicians.

The picture shows four boys in quasi-Classical costume, three playing various musical instruments or singing, the fourth dressed as Cupid and reaching towards a bunch of grapes. The picture is an allegory relating music to the sustenance of love in the same way that food is the sustenance of life. 

Caravaggio seems to have composed the painting from studies of two figures. The central figure with the lute has been identified with Caravaggio's companion Mario Minniti, and the individual next to him and facing the viewer is possibly a self-portrait of the artist. The cupid bears a strong resemblance to the boy in Boy Peeling Fruit, done a few years before, and also to the angel in Saint Francis of Assisi in Ecstasy.

The manuscripts show that the boys are practicing madrigals celebrating love, and the eyes of the lutenist, the principal figure, are moist with tears—the songs presumably describe the sorrow of love rather than its pleasures. The violin in the foreground suggests a fifth participant, implicitly including the viewer in the tableau.

Scenes showing musicians were a popular theme at the time—the Church was supporting a revival of music and new styles and forms were being tried, especially by educated and progressive prelates such as Del Monte. This scene, however, is clearly secular rather than religious, and harks back to the long-established tradition of "concert" pictures, a genre originating in Venice and exemplified, in its earlier form, by Titian's Le concert champêtre.

This was Caravaggio's most ambitious and complex composition to date, and the artist has evidently had difficulties with painting the four figures separately—they don't relate to each other or to the picture-space, and the overall effect is somewhat clumsy. The painting is in poor condition, and the music in the manuscript has been badly damaged by past restorations, although a tenor and an alto part can be made out. Nevertheless, despite considerable paint loss, the work's originality remains undimmed.

Loan to Australia
During the COVID-19 pandemic, the museum began a skylight replacement project that resulted in gallery closures, in response the Met loaned major works from the European collection, including 'The Musicians', to Qagoma in an exhibition titled ‘European Masterpieces’.

See also
List of paintings by Caravaggio

References

External links
A Caravaggio Rediscovered, The Lute Player, an exhibition catalog from The Metropolitan Museum of Art (fully available online as PDF), which contains material on this painting (see cat. no. 3)
 

1590s paintings
Paintings by Caravaggio
Paintings in the collection of the Metropolitan Museum of Art
Self-portraits
Paintings of Cupid
Musical instruments in art